The Taganrog constituency (No.151) is a Russian legislative constituency in Rostov Oblast. Until 2007 the constituency was based in Taganrog, its surroundings and Azov Sea coast, however, after 2015 redistricting the constituency was extended to Rostov-on-Don, but it lost Azov to Nizhnedonskoy constituency.

Members elected

Election results

1993

|-
! colspan=2 style="background-color:#E9E9E9;text-align:left;vertical-align:top;" |Candidate
! style="background-color:#E9E9E9;text-align:left;vertical-align:top;" |Party
! style="background-color:#E9E9E9;text-align:right;" |Votes
! style="background-color:#E9E9E9;text-align:right;" |%
|-
|style="background-color:"|
|align=left|Yury Rodionov
|align=left|Independent
|
|16.34%
|-
|style="background-color:"|
|align=left|Oleg Nabokov
|align=left|Independent
| -
|15.97%
|-
| colspan="5" style="background-color:#E9E9E9;"|
|- style="font-weight:bold"
| colspan="3" style="text-align:left;" | Total
| 
| 100%
|-
| colspan="5" style="background-color:#E9E9E9;"|
|- style="font-weight:bold"
| colspan="4" |Source:
|
|}

1995

|-
! colspan=2 style="background-color:#E9E9E9;text-align:left;vertical-align:top;" |Candidate
! style="background-color:#E9E9E9;text-align:left;vertical-align:top;" |Party
! style="background-color:#E9E9E9;text-align:right;" |Votes
! style="background-color:#E9E9E9;text-align:right;" |%
|-
|style="background-color:"|
|align=left|Nikolay Borisenko
|align=left|Communist Party
|
|24.96%
|-
|style="background-color:"|
|align=left|Viktor Vodolatsky
|align=left|Independent
|
|14.79%
|-
|style="background-color:"|
|align=left|Vladimir Verba
|align=left|Independent
|
|10.14%
|-
|style="background-color:"|
|align=left|Sergey Mironov
|align=left|Yabloko
|
|9.92%
|-
|style="background-color:"|
|align=left|Nikolay Zheleznyakov
|align=left|Independent
|
|8.43%
|-
|style="background-color:"|
|align=left|Vladimir Akimenko
|align=left|Liberal Democratic Party
|
|6.71%
|-
|style="background-color:#2C299A"|
|align=left|Olga Nikitina
|align=left|Congress of Russian Communities
|
|4.48%
|-
|style="background-color:"|
|align=left|Yury Mitev
|align=left|Independent
|
|4.07%
|-
|style="background-color:#D50000"|
|align=left|Gennady Sagalayev
|align=left|Communists and Working Russia - for the Soviet Union
|
|1.51%
|-
|style="background-color:"|
|align=left|Vasily Kogan
|align=left|Serving Russia!
|
|1.47%
|-
|style="background-color:#1C1A0D"|
|align=left|Valery Dronov
|align=left|Forward, Russia!
|
|1.16%
|-
|style="background-color:#2998D5"|
|align=left|Nikolay Popov
|align=left|Russian All-People's Movement
|
|1.25%
|-
|style="background-color:#00A200"|
|align=left|Vladimir Kolyada
|align=left|Transformation of the Fatherland
|
|1.04%
|-
|style="background-color:"|
|align=left|Aleksandr Chernenko
|align=left|Independent
|
|0.74%
|-
|style="background-color:#000000"|
|colspan=2 |against all
|
|6.80%
|-
| colspan="5" style="background-color:#E9E9E9;"|
|- style="font-weight:bold"
| colspan="3" style="text-align:left;" | Total
| 
| 100%
|-
| colspan="5" style="background-color:#E9E9E9;"|
|- style="font-weight:bold"
| colspan="4" |Source:
|
|}

1999

|-
! colspan=2 style="background-color:#E9E9E9;text-align:left;vertical-align:top;" |Candidate
! style="background-color:#E9E9E9;text-align:left;vertical-align:top;" |Party
! style="background-color:#E9E9E9;text-align:right;" |Votes
! style="background-color:#E9E9E9;text-align:right;" |%
|-
|style="background-color:"|
|align=left|Vladimir Grebenyuk
|align=left|Independent
|
|43.61%
|-
|style="background-color:"|
|align=left|Nikolay Borisenko (incumbent)
|align=left|Communist Party
|
|32.89%
|-
|style="background-color:"|
|align=left|Viktor Radionov
|align=left|Independent
|
|4.37%
|-
|style="background-color:#084284"|
|align=left|Anatoly Dygay
|align=left|Spiritual Heritage
|
|1.77%
|-
|style="background-color:#000000"|
|colspan=2 |against all
|
|15.50%
|-
| colspan="5" style="background-color:#E9E9E9;"|
|- style="font-weight:bold"
| colspan="3" style="text-align:left;" | Total
| 
| 100%
|-
| colspan="5" style="background-color:#E9E9E9;"|
|- style="font-weight:bold"
| colspan="4" |Source:
|
|}

2003

|-
! colspan=2 style="background-color:#E9E9E9;text-align:left;vertical-align:top;" |Candidate
! style="background-color:#E9E9E9;text-align:left;vertical-align:top;" |Party
! style="background-color:#E9E9E9;text-align:right;" |Votes
! style="background-color:#E9E9E9;text-align:right;" |%
|-
|style="background-color:"|
|align=left|Vladimir Grebenyuk (incumbent)
|align=left|United Russia
|
|51.39%
|-
|style="background-color:"|
|align=left|Viktor Bulgakov
|align=left|Communist Party
|
|20.99%
|-
|style="background-color:"|
|align=left|Roman Shakhov
|align=left|Liberal Democratic Party
|
|5.37%
|-
|style="background-color:"|
|align=left|Elvira Sharova
|align=left|Independent
|
|4.89%
|-
|style="background-color:#164C8C"|
|align=left|Yury Podkolzin
|align=left|United Russian Party Rus'
|
|2.53%
|-
|style="background-color:#000000"|
|colspan=2 |against all
|
|13.03%
|-
| colspan="5" style="background-color:#E9E9E9;"|
|- style="font-weight:bold"
| colspan="3" style="text-align:left;" | Total
| 
| 100%
|-
| colspan="5" style="background-color:#E9E9E9;"|
|- style="font-weight:bold"
| colspan="4" |Source:
|
|}

2016

|-
! colspan=2 style="background-color:#E9E9E9;text-align:left;vertical-align:top;" |Candidate
! style="background-color:#E9E9E9;text-align:leftt;vertical-align:top;" |Party
! style="background-color:#E9E9E9;text-align:right;" |Votes
! style="background-color:#E9E9E9;text-align:right;" |%
|-
| style="background-color:"|
|align=left|Yury Kobzev
|align=left|United Russia
|
|46.70%
|-
|style="background-color:"|
|align=left|Nikolay Kolomeytsev
|align=left|Communist Party
|
|20.97%
|-
|style="background-color:"|
|align=left|Yulia Vasilchenko
|align=left|Liberal Democratic Party
|
|10.29%
|-
| style="background-color: " |
|align=left|Aleksandr Pitsenko
|align=left|A Just Russia
|
|8.71%
|-
|style="background-color:"|
|align=left|Valery Meleshko
|align=left|Rodina
|
|2.48%
|-
|style="background-color: " |
|align=left|Sergey Shalygin
|align=left|Yabloko
|
|2.30%
|-
|style="background-color:"|
|align=left|Aleksey Zaydlin
|align=left|Communists of Russia
|
|2.25%
|-
|style="background-color:"|
|align=left|Pyotr Malyshevsky
|align=left|The Greens
|
|1.25%
|-
|style="background-color:"|
|align=left|Aleksandr Bezruchenko
|align=left|Civic Platform
|
|1.04%
|-
|style="background-color:"|
|align=left|Arnold Reizvig
|align=left|Patriots of Russia
|
|0.65%
|-
| colspan="5" style="background-color:#E9E9E9;"|
|- style="font-weight:bold"
| colspan="3" style="text-align:left;" | Total
| 
| 100%
|-
| colspan="5" style="background-color:#E9E9E9;"|
|- style="font-weight:bold"
| colspan="4" |Source:
|
|}

2021

|-
! colspan=2 style="background-color:#E9E9E9;text-align:left;vertical-align:top;" |Candidate
! style="background-color:#E9E9E9;text-align:left;vertical-align:top;" |Party
! style="background-color:#E9E9E9;text-align:right;" |Votes
! style="background-color:#E9E9E9;text-align:right;" |%
|-
| style="background-color:"|
|align=left|Sergey Burlakov
|align=left|United Russia
|
|40.72%
|-
|style="background-color:"|
|align=left|Yevgeny Bessonov
|align=left|Communist Party
|
|28.64%
|-
|style="background-color:"|
|align=left|Nikolay Anisimov
|align=left|Liberal Democratic Party
|
|8.39%
|-
|style="background-color:"|
|align=left|Sergey Kosinov
|align=left|A Just Russia — For Truth
|
|5.29%
|-
|style="background-color:"|
|align=left|Aleksandr Chukhlebov
|align=left|New People
|
|4.78%
|-
|style="background-color: "|
|align=left|Lyudmila Sova
|align=left|Party of Pensioners
|
|4.15%
|-
|style="background-color: " |
|align=left|Vladimir Beradze
|align=left|Yabloko
|
|2.07%
|-
|style="background-color: "|
|align=left|Oleg Kichan
|align=left|Russian Party of Freedom and Justice
|
|1.52%
|-
|style="background-color:"|
|align=left|Igor Borisov
|align=left|Party of Growth
|
|1.35%
|-
|style="background-color:"|
|align=left|Igor Ponomarenko
|align=left|Green Alternative
|
|1.25%
|-
| colspan="5" style="background-color:#E9E9E9;"|
|- style="font-weight:bold"
| colspan="3" style="text-align:left;" | Total
| 
| 100%
|-
| colspan="5" style="background-color:#E9E9E9;"|
|- style="font-weight:bold"
| colspan="4" |Source:
|
|}

Notes

References

Russian legislative constituencies
Politics of Rostov Oblast